Diron Vester Talbert (born July 1, 1944) is a former American football defensive end.

Football career
Talbert played college football at the University of Texas where he was inducted into the Longhorn Hall of Fame in 2005.

Talbert played for the Los Angeles Rams from 1967 to 1970. He was traded along with Jack Pardee, Maxie Baughan, Myron Pottios, John Wilbur, Jeff Jordan and a 1971 fifth-round pick (124th overall–traded to Green Bay Packers for Boyd Dowler) from the Rams to the Redskins for Marlin McKeever, first and third rounders in 1971 (10th and 63rd overall–Isiah Robertson and Dave Elmendorf respectively) and third, fourth, fifth, sixth and seventh rounders in 1972 (73rd, 99th, 125th, 151st and 177th overall–to New England Patriots, traded to Philadelphia Eagles for Joe Carollo, Bob Christiansen, Texas Southern defensive tackle Eddie Herbert and to New York Giants respectively) on January 28, 1971. In 1971, he began playing defensive tackle for the Washington Redskins until his retirement in 1980. It was during this period that Talbert played an iconic role as part of the long-standing 1970s rivalry between the Redskins and the Dallas Cowboys.

Talbert was a key member of 1972 NFC Championship team. He played for 14 NFL seasons for a total of 186 games.  He went to the Pro Bowl after the 1974 season.

After football
After retiring from football, Talbert entered the investment business and was involved with hotels, real estate and oil. He also owns and operates a retail grocery business along with his brother Don in Rosenberg, Texas.

Personal life
His older brother Don Talbert also played in the NFL.  Prior to attending the University of Texas, both of the Talbert brothers were high school linemen at Texas City High School in Texas City, Texas.

References

1944 births
Living people
American football defensive tackles
Los Angeles Rams players
Washington Redskins players
National Conference Pro Bowl players
Texas Longhorns football players
People from Texas City, Texas